Cruella can refer to:

Cruella de Vil, a character in the 101 Dalmatians novel, three films, and animated series
Cruella (film), a live-action crime film based on the Disney animated character
Cruella, a fetish magazine
Krewella, an American electronic dance music group